Ponerorchis amplexifolia is a species of flowering plant in the family Orchidaceae, native to south-central China (west Sichuan).

Taxonomy
The species was first described in 1936 by Tsin Tang and Fa Tsuan Wang as Amitostigma amplexifolium. A molecular phylogenetic study in 2014 found that species of Amitostigma, Neottianthe and Ponerorchis were mixed together in a single clade, making none of the three genera monophyletic as then circumscribed. Amitostigma and Neottianthe were subsumed into Ponerorchis, with this species becoming Ponerorchis amplexifolia.

References

amplexifolia
Orchids of Sichuan
Plants described in 1936